Stuart Allan is an American actor. He is best known for his performance of the character of Damian Wayne in Son of Batman, Batman vs. Robin, Batman: Bad Blood, Justice League vs. Teen Titans, Teen Titans: The Judas Contract, Batman: Hush, and Justice League Dark: Apokolips War, and Russell Clay in Transformers: Robots in Disguise.

Filmography

Television

Films

Video games

Awards and nominations
Allan was nominated for "Best Performance in a Voice-Over Role - Young Actor for" category in the 36th Young Artist Awards.

References

External links
 
 

Living people
American male child actors
American male film actors
American male television actors
Place of birth missing (living people)
American male voice actors
21st-century American male actors
Year of birth missing (living people)